The Secret Garden Festival is a 48-hour forest-themed dress-up festival located in Sydney. The festival provides music as well as small parties, plays, comedy, games and art. With over 5,000 patrons attending each year, the festival has and continues to raise money for charities.

Location 
Secret Garden is located one hour south of Sydney. The location is kept secret until a few days prior to the event, when all newcomers are sent an email with the address. It can be accessed via car, or if not there is a bus package available to ticket holders, which leaves from Central station.

Artist Lineups

2016
 Adi Toohey
 Ariane
 Bad//Dreems
 Black Vanilla
 BUOY
 CC:DISCO!
 Cruisin' Deuces
 Dorsal Fins
 Elizabeth Rose (DJ)
 Ella Thompson
 Gang of Youths
 GG MAGREE
 Gordi
 Green Buzzard
 Hayden James
 Hey Geronimo
 Jess Kent
 Jody
 Jonathan Boulet
 L-Fresh the Lion
 Levins
 Love Bombs
 Luen
 Mansionair
 Matt Corby
 Money For Nothing DJs
 Montaigne
 Moonbase Commander
 Motorik Vibe Council
 Palms
 Planète
 Purple Sneakers & Friends
 Raury
 Rock & Roll Karaoke
 Roland Tings
 Sampa the Great
 Saskwatch
 Sex On Toast
 Shag
 Shantan Wantan Ichiban
 Steregamous
 The Completely Boys
 The Lulu Raes
 The Meeting Tree
 Tuka
 World Champion

2015  
 Ariane
 Baro
 Client Liaison
 Devotional
 Donny Benét (Solo)
 Fishing
 Frames
 Gang of Youths
 Gooch Palms
 Grace
 Heartbeat DJs
 Heather Woods Broderick
 Holiday Sidewinder
 Hot Dub Time Machine
 I Oh You DJs
 Jack Ladder and The Dreamlanders
 Japanese Wallpaper
 Jeremy Neale
 Joe Liddy & The Skeleton Horse
 JÜAN DU SOL
 Lake Street Dive
 Le Fruit DJs
 Levins
 Little Bastard
 Little May
 Love Bombs
 LUCIANBLOMKAMP
 Luen
 Luluc
 Lunice
 Mike Who
 Milwaukee Banks
 No Zu
 Oh Mercy
 Oisima
 Parquet Courts
 Pepa Knight
 Peter Combe
 Purple Sneakers DJs
 Remi
 Rolls Bayce
 RY4
 San Holo
 Shag
 Shantan Wantan Ichiban
 Sharon Van Etten
 Softwar B2B Slow Blow
 Spookyland
 Stereogamous ft. Shaun J. Wright
 Steve Smyth
 Stolen Violin
 Tees
 The Griswolds
 The Morrisons
 Total Giovanni
 UV Boi
 Velociraptor
 Willow Beats
 Wintercoats
 Yo Grito! DJs
 Yon Yonson

2014 
 Alex Cameron
 Ariane
 Blank Realm
 Bloods
 Client Liaison
 Cosmos Midnight
 D. D. Dumbo
 Day Ravies
 Dusty Fingers
 DZ Deathrays
 Elizabeth Rose
 Ernest Ellis
 Goldroom
 Joyride
 Ken Davis
 King Gizzard & the Lizard Wizard
 Lancelot
 Levins
 Little May
 Love Bombs
 Mighty Mouse
 Mike Who
 Nantes
 Olympia
 Palms
 Papa Vs Pretty
 Richard In Your Mind
 Roland Tings
 Ryan Hemsworth
 Shantan Wantan Ichiban
 Shining Bird
 Slowblow & Softwar
 Steve Smyth
 Straight Arrows
 Sures
 The Beatnix
 The Donny Benét Show Band
 The Rubens
 The Trouble with Templeton
 True Vibenation
 Wordlife
 World's End Press

2013 
 Alison Wonderland
 Caitlin Park
 Cliques
 Collarbones
 Cub Scouts
 DCUP
 Frames
 Furnance and the Fundamentals
 Joyride
 Lancelot
 Little Bastard
 Little May
 Oliver Tank
 Pelvis
 Rainbow Chan
 Rüfüs
 DJ Crocs
 Softwar & Slowball
 Spit Syndicate
 The Aston Shuffle
 The Delta Riggs
 The Griswolds
 The Preatures
 Vance Joy

2012 
 Alison Wonderland
 Castlecomer
 DreamDelay
 Emma Davis
 Evan and the Brave
 Fanny Lumsden
 Georgia Fair
 Horse Meat Disco (UK)
 Jack Carty
 Joyride (DJ Set)
 Kira Puru and the Bruise
 New Navy
 Owl Eyes
 R + R
 SlowBlow
 Softwar
 Sticky Fingers
 The Aston Shuffle DJs
 The Be Sharps
 The Essential Stix
 The Preachers
 Tin Sparrow
 Wordlife (Bang Gang 12 inches)

Charities 
All proceeds made at Secret Garden are donated each year to various charities. Over the past seven years Secret Garden has raised more than $200,000 for charities including Oxfam, The Sarah Hilt Foundation and The Girls & Boys Brigade.

Reception 
Since its conception in 2009, Secret Garden has grown incredibly. In 2015 Australian radio station Triple J named it "One of Australia's much-loved boutique festivals ... providing two days worth of ace artists at a secret dairy farm". Time Out Sydney also praised the festival, telling punters "This is a good one, though, and worth the mystery. They keep the crowds at a limited capacity, the vibe is loved-up and the site teems with secret pathways and hidden pop-ups housing food, art and entertainment."

Other reviews include:

"A magical, wild and completely creative festival of music and art." - The AU Review

"Pillow forts, giant jellyfish and kissing booths — this independent festival has and always will be built by and for the people." - Concrete Playground

"The most magical of festivals to grace the Australian music scene" - Pedestrian TV

References 

Music festivals in Australia